Regency is an unincorporated community in Mills County, located in the U.S. state of Texas. According to the Handbook of Texas, the community had a population of 25 in 2000.

History
Regency was originally named Hanna Valley and Hannaville for the local Hanna family. David Hanna and his slaves were among the first settlers here in 1854 until his four brothers and his dad, Jesse, followed suit that next year. They drove horses and cattle. The female members of the Hanna family convinced the male members to stay in the area because of the songbirds. They built the first house in 1856. The Comanche invaded the community in 1862 until the threat of Indian raids disappeared by the next decade, but it only caused more crime among vigilante groups and fought cattle rustling since there were no nearby courthouses. They became criminal mobs terrorizing San Saba County and other surrounding areas until the Texas Rangers came in 1896. Captain William J. McDonald came in May of 1897. The community's first store was built in 1871. A post office was established in 1876 and remained in operation until the early 1930s, with Jim Hanna serving as the postmaster. It experienced a two-year interruption. Mail was then routed from Mullin. The community had a population of 50 in 1884. There was another place called Hanna Valley in Texas, so postal authorities accepted the name Regency. The population remained at 50 in 1890 and had a gristmill and a cotton gin. Five years later, the population jumped to 200 and had a church, a general store, a flour mill and gin, a physician, and a constable. The population plunged to 40 from 1920 to 1940 and had less than a dozen scattered houses in 1936. The store closed in 1971. The population went down to 20 from 1990 through 2000.

Regency is home to the Regency Bridge, a suspension bridge traveling over the Colorado River between Mills and San Saba counties. It is listed on the National Register of Historic Places.

Geography

Education
Today, the community is served by the Mullin Independent School District.

References

Unincorporated communities in Mills County, Texas
Unincorporated communities in Texas